The Holocaust in Poland was part of the European-wide Holocaust organized by Nazi Germany and took place in German-occupied Poland. During the genocide, three million Polish Jews were murdered, half of all Jews murdered during the Holocaust.

The Holocaust in Poland was marked by the construction of death camps by Nazi Germany, German use of gas vans, and mass shootings by German troops and their Ukrainian and Lithuanian auxiliaries. The extermination camps played a central role in the extermination both of Polish Jews, and of Jews whom Germany transported to their deaths from western and southern Europe.

Every branch of the sophisticated German bureaucracy was involved in the killing process, from the interior and finance ministries to German firms and state-run railroads. Approximately 98 percent of Jewish population of Nazi-occupied Poland during the Holocaust were killed. About 350,000 Polish Jews survived the war; most survivors never lived in Nazi-occupied Poland, but lived in the Soviet-occupied zone of Poland during 1939 and 1940, and fled or were evacuated by the Soviets further east to avoid the German advance in 1941.

Of over 3,000,000 Polish Jews deported to Nazi concentration camps, only about 50,000 survived.

Background

Following the 1939 invasion of Poland, in accordance with the secret protocol of the Molotov–Ribbentrop Pact, Nazi Germany and the Soviet Union partitioned Poland into occupation zones. Large areas of western Poland were annexed by Germany. Some 52% of Poland's territory, mainly the Kresy borderlands—inhabited by between 13.2 and 13.7 million people, including 1,300,000 Jews—was annexed by the Soviet Union. An estimated 157,000 to 375,000 Polish Jews either fled into the Soviet Union or were deported eastward by the Soviet authorities. Within months, Polish Jews in the Soviet zone who refused to swear allegiance were deported deep into the Soviet interior along with ethnic Poles. The number of deported Polish Jews is estimated at 200,000–230,000 men, women, and children.

The Soviet occupation was short-lived because the terms of the pact were broken when the German armed forces invaded the Soviet Union in Operation Barbarossa on June 22, 1941 (see map). From 1941 to 1943, all of Poland was under Germany's control. The semi-colonial  General Government, set up in central and southeastern Poland, comprised 39 percent of occupied Polish territory.

Nazi ghettoization policy

Prior to World War II, there were 3,500,000 Jews in Poland, living mainly in cities: about 10% of the general population. The database of the POLIN Museum of the History of Polish Jews provides information on 1,926 Jewish communities across the country. Following the conquest of Poland and the 1939 murder of intelligentsia, the first German anti-Jewish measures involved a policy of expelling Jews from Polish territories annexed by the Third Reich. The westernmost provinces, of Greater Poland and Pomerelia, were turned into new German Reichsgaue named Danzig-West Prussia and Wartheland, with the intent to completely Germanize them through settler colonization (Lebensraum). Annexed directly to the new Warthegau district, the city of Łódź absorbed an initial influx of some 40,000 Polish Jews forced out of surrounding areas. A total of 204,000 Jewish people passed through the ghetto in Łódź. Initially, they were to be expelled to the Generalgouvernement. However, the ultimate destination for the massive removal of Jews was left open until the Final Solution was set in motion two years later.

Persecution of Polish Jews by the German occupation authorities began immediately after the invasion, particularly in major urban areas. In the first year and a half, the Nazis confined themselves to stripping the Jews of their valuables and property for profit, herding them into makeshift ghettos, and forced them into slave labor. During this period, the Germans ordered Jewish communities to appoint Jewish Councils (Judenräte) to administer the ghettos and to be "responsible in the strictest sense" for carrying out orders. Most ghettos were established in cities and towns where Jewish life was already well organized. In a massive deportation action involving the use of freight trains, all Polish Jews had been segregated from the rest of society in dilapidated neighborhoods (Jüdischer Wohnbezirk) adjacent to the existing rail corridors. The food aid was completely dependent on the SS, and the Jews were sealed off from the general public in an unsustainable manner.

The plight of Jews in war-torn Poland could be divided into stages defined by the existence of the ghettos. Before the formation of ghettos, the escape from persecution did not involve extrajudicial punishment by death. Once the ghettos were sealed off from the outside, death by starvation and disease became rampant, alleviated only by the smuggling of food and medicine by Polish gentile volunteers, in what was described by Emanuel Ringelblum as "one of the finest pages in the history between the two peoples". In Warsaw, up to 80 percent of food consumed in the ghetto was brought in illegally. The food stamps introduced by the Germans, provided only 9 percent of the calories necessary for survival. In the two and a half years between November 1940 and May 1943, around 100,000 Jews were murdered in the Warsaw Ghetto by forced starvation and disease; and about 40,000 in the Łódź Ghetto in the four-and-a-quarter years between May 1940 and August 1944. By the end of 1941, most ghettoized Jews had no savings left to pay the SS for further bulk food deliveries. The 'productionists' among the German authoritieswho attempted to make the ghettos self-sustaining by turning them into enterprisesprevailed over the 'attritionists' only after the German invasion of the Soviet Union. The most prominent ghettos were thus temporarily stabilized through the production of goods needed at the front, as death rates among the Jewish population there began to decline.

Holocaust by bullets

From the first days of the war, violence against civilians accompanied the arrival of German troops. In the September 1939 Częstochowa massacre, 150 Jewish Poles were among the circa 1,140 Polish civilians shot by German Wehrmacht troops. In November 1939, outside Ostrów Mazowiecka, around 500 Jewish men, women and children were shot in mass graves. In December 1939, around 100 Jews were shot by Wehrmacht soldiers and gendarmes at Kolo.

Following the German attack on the USSR in June 1941, Himmler assembled a force of some 11,000 men to pursue a program of physical annihilation of Jews. Also during Operation Barbarossa, the SS had recruited collaborationist auxiliary police from among Soviet POWs and local police which included Russians, Ukrainians, Latvians, Lithuanians and Volksdeutche. The local Schutzmannschaft provided Germany with manpower and critical knowledge of local regions and languages. In what became known as the "Holocaust by bullets", the German police battalions (Orpo), SiPo, Waffen-SS, and special-task Einsatzgruppen, along with Ukrainian and Lithuanian auxiliaries, operated behind  front lines, systematically shooting tens of thousands of men, women, and children. The Wehrmacht participated in many aspects of the Holocaust by bullets.

Massacres were committed in over 30 locations across the formerly Soviet-occupied parts of Poland, including in Brześć, Tarnopol, and Białystok, as well as in prewar provincial capitals of Łuck, Lwów, Stanisławów, and Wilno (see Ponary).  The survivors of mass killing operations were incarcerated in the new ghettos of economic exploitation, and slowly starved to death by artificial famine at the whim of German authorities. Because of sanitation concerns, the corpses of people who had died as a result of starvation and mistreatment were buried in mass graves in their tens of thousands. Gas vans became available in November 1941; in June 1942 the Polish National Council's Samuel Zygelbaum reported that these had murdered 35,000 Jews in Lodz alone. He also reported that Gestapo agents were routinely dragging Jews out of their homes and shooting them on the street in broad daylight. By December 1941, about one million Jews had been murdered by Nazi Einsatzgruppen in the Soviet Union. The 'war of destruction' policy in the east against 'the Jewish race' became common knowledge among the Germans at all levels. The total number of shooting victims in the east who were Jewish are around 1.3 to 1.5 million. Entire regions behind the German–Soviet Frontier were reported to Berlin by the Nazi death squads to be "Judenfrei".

Final Solution and liquidation of Ghettos

On January 20, 1942, during the Wannsee conference near Berlin, State Secretary of the Government General, Josef Bühler, urged Reinhard Heydrich to begin the proposed "final solution to the Jewish question" as soon as possible. The industrial killing by exhaust fumes had been tested over several weeks at the Chełmno extermination camp in the then-Wartheland, under the guise of resettlement. All condemned Ghetto prisoners were told they were going to labour camps, and asked to pack a carry-on luggage. Many Jews believed in the transfer ruse, since deportations were also part of the ghettoization process. Meanwhile, the idea of mass murder by means of stationary gas chambers was developed by September 1941 or earlier. It was a precondition for the newly drafted Operation Reinhard led by Odilo Globocnik who ordered the construction of death camps at Belzec, Sobibór, and Treblinka. At Majdanek and Auschwitz, the work of the stationary gas chambers began in March and May respectively, preceded by experiments with Zyklon B. Between 1942 and 1944, the most extreme measure of the Holocaust, the extermination of millions of Jews from Poland and all over Europe was carried out in six extermination camps. There were no Polish guards at any of the Reinhard camps, despite the sometimes used misnomer Polish death camps. All killing centres were designed and operated by the Nazis in strict secrecy, aided by the Ukrainian Trawnikis. Civilians were forbidden to approach them and often shot if caught near the train tracks.

Systematic liquidation of the ghettos began across General Government in the early spring of 1942. At that point, the only chance for survival was escape to the "Aryan side". The German round-ups for the so-called resettlement trains were connected directly with the use of top secret extermination facilities built for the SS at about the same time by various German engineering companies including HAHB, I.A. Topf and Sons of Erfurt, and C.H. Kori GmbH.

Unlike other Nazi concentration camps, where prisoners from all across Europe were exploited for the war effort, German death campspart of the secret Operation Reinhardtwere designed exclusively for the rapid and industrial-scale murder of Polish and foreign Jews, subsisting in isolation. The camp's German overseers reported to Heinrich Himmler in Berlin, who kept control of the extermination program, but who delegated the work in Poland to SS and police chief Odilo Globocnik of the Lublin Reservation. The selection of sites, construction of facilities and training of personnel was based on a similar (Action T4) "racial hygiene" program of mass murder through involuntary euthanasia, developed in Germany.

Deportation
The Holocaust trains increased the scale and duration of the extermination process; and, the enclosed nature of freight cars reduced the troop numbers required to guard them. Rail shipments allowed the Nazi Germans to build and operate larger and more efficient death camps and, at the same time, openly lie to the worldand to their victimsabout a "resettlement" program. An unspecified number of deportees died in transit during Operation Reinhard from suffocation and thirst. They were not supplied with food or water. The Güterwagen boxcars were only fitted with a bucket latrine. A small barred window provided little ventilation, which often resulted in multiple deaths. A survivor of the Treblinka uprising testified about one such train, from Biała Podlaska. When the sealed doors flew open, 90 percent of about 6,000 Jewish prisoners were found to have suffocated to death. Their bodies were thrown into smouldering mass grave at the "Lazaret". Millions of people were transported in similar trainsets to the extermination camps under the direction of the German Ministry of Transport, and tracked by an IBM subsidiary, until the official date of closing of the Auschwitz-Birkenau complex in December 1944.

Death factories were only one means of mass extermination. There were secluded killing sites set up further east. At Bronna Góra (the Bronna Mount, now Belarus) 50,000 Jews were murdered in execution pits; delivered by the Holocaust trains from the ghettos in Brześć, Bereza, Janów Poleski, Kobryń, Horodec (pl), Antopol and other locations along the western border of Reichskommissariat Ostland. Explosives were used to reduce the time taken by digging. At the Sosenki Forest on the outskirts of Równe in prewar Wołyń Voivodeship, over 23,000 Jewish adults and children were shot. At the Górka Połonka forest (see map) 25,000 Jews forced to disrobe and lay over the bodies of others were shot in waves; most of them were deported there via the Łuck Ghetto. The execution site for the Lwów Ghetto inmates was arranged near Janowska, with 35,000–40,000 Jewish victims murdered and buried at the Piaski ravine.

While the Order Police performed liquidations of the Jewish ghettos in occupied Poland, loading prisoners into railcars and shooting those unable to move or attempting to flee, the collaborationist auxiliary police were used as a means of inflicting terror upon Jews by conducting large-scale massacres in the same locations. They were deployed in all major killing sites of Operation Reinhard (terror was a primary aim of their SS training). The Ukrainian Trawniki men formed into units took an active role in the extermination of Jews at Belzec, Sobibór, Treblinka II; during the Warsaw Ghetto Uprising (on three occasions, see Stroop Report), Częstochowa, Lublin, Lwów, Radom, Kraków, Białystok (twice), Majdanek, Auschwitz, the Trawniki concentration camp itself, and the remaining subcamps of KL Lublin/Majdanek camp complex including Poniatowa, Budzyń, Kraśnik, Puławy, Lipowa, and also during massacres in Łomazy, Międzyrzec, Łuków, Radzyń, Parczew, Końskowola, Komarówka and all other locations, augmented by members of the SS, SD, Kripo, as well as the reserve police battalions from Orpo (each, responsible for annihilation of thousands of Jews). In the north-east, the "Poachers' Brigade" of Oskar Dirlewanger trained Belarusian Home Guard in murder expeditions with the help of Belarusian Auxiliary Police. By the end of World War II in Europe in May 1945, over 90% of Polish Jewry perished.

Chełmno extermination camp

The Chełmno extermination camp was built as the first death camp following Hitler's launch of Operation Barbarossa. It was a pilot project for the development of other extermination sites. The killing method at Chełmno grew out of the 'euthanasia' program in which busloads of unsuspecting hospital patients were gassed in air-tight shower rooms at Bernburg, Hadamar and Sonnenstein.

All Jews from the Judenfrei district of Wartheland were deported to Chełmno under the guise of 'resettlement'. At least 145,000 prisoners from the Łódź Ghetto were murdered at Chełmno in several waves of deportations lasting from 1942 to 1944. Among those were also approximately 11,000 Jews from Germany, Austria, Czechia and Luxembourg murdered in April 1941 and close to 5,000 Roma from Austria, murdered in January 1942. Almost all victims were murdered with the use of mobile gas vans (Sonderwagen), which had reconfigured exhaust pipes. In the last phase of the camp's existence, the exhumed bodies were cremated in open-air for several weeks during Sonderaktion 1005. The ashes, mixed with crushed bones, were trucked every night to the nearby river in sacks made from blankets, to remove the evidence of mass murder.

Auschwitz-Birkenau

The Auschwitz concentration camp was the largest of the German Nazi extermination centers. The overwhelming majority of prisoners deported there were murdered within hours of their arrival. The camp was the location of the first permanent gas chambers in March 1942. The extermination of Jews with Zyklon B as the killing agent began in July. At Birkenau, the four killing installations (each consisting of coatrooms, multiple gas chambers and industrial-scale crematoria) were built in the following year. By late 1943, Birkenau was engaged in industrial-scale murder, with four so-called 'Bunkers' (totaling over a dozen gas chambers) working around the clock. Up to 6,000 people were gassed and cremated there each day, after the ruthless 'selection process' at the Judenrampe. Only about 10 percent of the deportees from transports organized by the Reich Main Security Office (RSHA) were registered and assigned to the Birkenau barracks.

Around 1.1 million people were murdered at Auschwitz. One million of them were Jews from across Europe including 200,000 children. Among the registered 400,000 victims (less than one-third of the total Auschwitz arrivals) were 140,000–150,000 non-Jewish Poles, 23,000 Gypsies, 15,000 Soviet POWs and 25,000 others. Auschwitz received a total of about 300,000 Jews from occupied Poland, shipped aboard freight trains from liquidated ghettos and transit camps, beginning with Bytom (February 15, 1942), Olkusz (three days of June), Otwock (in August), Łomża and Ciechanów (November), then Kraków (March 13, 1943), Auschwitz-Birkenau gas chambers and crematoria were blown up on November 25, 1944, in an attempt to destroy the evidence of mass-murder, by the orders of SS chief Heinrich Himmler.

Treblinka

Designed and built for the sole purpose of exterminating its internees, Treblinka was one of only three such facilities in existence; the other two were Bełżec and Sobibór. All of them were situated in wooded areas away from population centres and linked to the Polish rail system by a branch line. They had transferable SS staff. Passports and money were collected for "safekeeping" at a cashier's booth set up by the "Road to Heaven", a fenced-off path leading into the gas chambers disguised as communal showers. Directly behind were the burial pits, dug with a crawler excavator.

The shipping of Jews from the Polish capital – plan known as the Großaktion Warschau – began immediately. During two months of the summer of 1942, about 254,000 Warsaw Ghetto inmates were exterminated at Treblinka (by some other accounts, at least 300,000). On arrival, the transportees were made to disrobe, then the menfollowed by women and childrenwere forced into double-walled chambers and murdered in batches of 200, with the use of exhaust fumes generated by a tank engine. The gas chambers, rebuilt of brick and expanded during August–September 1942, were capable of murdering 12,000 to 15,000 victims every day, with a maximum capacity of 22,000 executions in twenty-four hours. The dead were initially buried in large mass graves, but the stench from the decomposing bodies could be smelled up to ten kilometers away. As a result, the Nazis began burning the bodies on open-air grids made of concrete pillars and railway tracks. The number of people murdered at Treblinka in about a year ranges from 800,000 to 1,200,000, with no exact figures available. The camp was closed by Globocnik on October 19, 1943, soon after the Treblinka prisoner uprising, with the murderous Operation Reinhard nearly completed.

Bełżec

The Bełżec extermination camp, established near the railroad station of Bełżec in the Lublin District, officially began operation on March 17, 1942, with three temporary gas chambers. Later, they were replaced with six made of brick and mortar, enabling the facility to handle over 1,000 victims at one time. At least 434,500 Jews were murdered there. The lack of verified survivors however, makes this camp little known. The bodies of the dead, buried in mass graves, swelled in the heat as a result of putrefaction making the earth split, which was resolved with the introduction of crematoria pits in October 1942.

Kurt Gerstein from Waffen-SS, supplying Zyklon B from Degesch during the Holocaust, wrote after the war in his Gerstein Report for the Allies that on August 17, 1942, at Belzec, he had witnessed the arrival of 45 wagons with 6,700 prisoners, of whom 1,450 were already dead inside. That train came with the Jewish people of the Lwów Ghetto, less than a hundred kilometers away. The last shipment of Jews (including those who had already died in transit) arrived in Bełżec in December 1942. The burning of exhumed corpses continued until March. The remaining 500 Sonderkommando prisoners who dismantled the camp, and who bore witness to the extermination process, were murdered at the nearby Sobibór extermination camp in the following months.

Sobibór

The Sobibór extermination camp, disguised as a railway transit camp not far from Lublin, began mass gassing operations in May 1942. As in other extermination centers, the Jews, taken off the Holocaust trains arriving from liquidated ghettos and transit camps (Izbica, Końskowola) were met by a member of SS dressed in a medical coat. Oberscharführer Hermann Michel gave the command for prisoners' "disinfection".

New arrivals were forced to split into groups, hand over their valuables, and disrobe inside a walled-off courtyard for a bath. Women had their hair cut off by the Sonderkommando barbers. Once undressed, Jews were led down a narrow path to the gas chambers which were disguised as showers. The victims were murdered with carbon monoxide gas from the exhaust pipes of a gasoline engine removed from a Red Army tank. Their bodies were taken out and burned in open pits over iron grids partly fueled by human body-fat. Their remains were dumped onto seven "ash mountains". The total number of Polish Jews murdered at Sobibór is estimated as at least 170,000. Heinrich Himmler ordered the camp dismantled following a prisoner revolt on October 14, 1943; one of only two successful uprisings by Jewish Sonderkommando inmates in any extermination camp, with 300 escapees (most of them were recaptured by the SS and killed).

Lublin-Majdanek

The Majdanek forced labor camp located on the outskirts of Lublin (like Sobibór) and closed temporarily during an epidemic of typhus, was reopened in March 1942 for Operation Reinhard; initially, as a storage depot for valuables stolen from gassed victims at Belzec, Sobibór, and Treblinka, It became a place of extermination of large Jewish populations from south-eastern Poland (Kraków, Lwów, Zamość, Warsaw) after the gas chambers were constructed in late 1942. The gassing of Polish Jews was performed in plain view of other inmates, without as much as a fence around the killing facilities. According to witness's testimony, "to drown the cries of the dying, tractor engines were run near the gas chambers" before they took the dead away to the crematorium. Majdanek was the site of the murder of 59,000 Polish Jews (from among its 79,000 victims). By the end of Operation Aktion Erntefest (Harvest Festival) conducted at Majdanek in early November 1943 (the single largest German massacre of Jews during the entire war), the camp had only 71 Jews left.

Armed resistance and ghetto uprisings

A popular misconception exists that most Jews went to their deaths passively. 10% of the Polish Army which fought alone against the Nazi-Soviet Invasion of Poland were Jewish Poles, some 100,000 troops. Of these, the Germans took 50,000 as prisoners-of-war and did not treat them according to the Geneva Convention; most were sent to concentration camps and then extermination camps. As Poland continued to fight an insurgency war against the occupying powers, other Jews joined the Polish Resistance, sometimes forming exclusively Jewish units.

Jewish resistance to the Nazis comprised their armed struggle, as well as spiritual and cultural opposition which brought dignity despite the inhumane conditions of life in the ghettos. Many forms of resistance existed, even though the elders were terrified by the prospect of mass retaliation against the women and children in the case of anti-Nazi revolt. As the German authorities undertook to liquidate the ghettos, armed resistance was offered in over 100 locations on either side of Polish-Soviet border of 1939, overwhelmingly in eastern Poland. Uprisings erupted in 5 major cities, 45 provincial towns, 5 major concentration and extermination camps, as well as in at least 18 forced labor camps. Significantly, the only rebellions in Nazi camps were Jewish.

The Nieśwież Ghetto insurgents in eastern Poland fought back on July 22, 1942. The Łachwa Ghetto revolt erupted on September 3. On October 14, 1942, the Mizocz Ghetto followed suit. The Warsaw Ghetto firefight of January 18, 1943, led to the largest Jewish uprising of World War II launched on April 19, 1943. On June 25, the Jews of the Częstochowa Ghetto rose up. At Treblinka, the Sonderkommando prisoners armed with stolen weapons attacked the guards on August 2, 1943. A day later, the Będzin and Sosnowiec ghetto revolts broke out. On August 16, the Białystok Ghetto uprising erupted. The revolt in Sobibór extermination camp occurred on October 14, 1943. At Auschwitz-Birkenau, the insurgents blew up one of Birkenau's crematoria on October 7, 1944. Similar resistance was offered in Łuck, Mińsk Mazowiecki, Pińsk, Poniatowa, and in Wilno.

Poles and Jews 

Polish nationals are the largest group by nationality with the title of Righteous Among the Nations, as honored by Yad Vashem. In light of the harsh punishments imposed by the German on rescuers, Yad Vashem calls the number of Polish Righteous "impressive". According to Gunnar S. Paulsson it is probable that these recognized Poles, over 6,000, "represent only the tip of the iceberg" of Polish rescuers. Some Jews received organized help from Żegota (The Council to Aid Jews), an underground organization of Polish resistance in German-occupied Poland. In his work on Warsaw's Jews, Paulsson demonstrates that under much harsher conditions of the occupation, Warsaw's Polish citizens managed to support and hide a comparable percentage of Jews as the citizens of Western countries such as Holland or Denmark.

According to historian Doris Bergen, there are three traditional interpretations of relations between Christian Poles and Jews during World War Two. The first one, Bergen refers to as the "Poles as arch-antisemite" theory which sees Poles as participating in the Holocaust. Bergen dismisses this approach by saying that while it may sometimes be "emotionally satisfying", it neglects the brutality of the German occupation directed at the Poles themselves. At the other extreme Bergen puts the "all Poles were victims of the Holocaust" school of thought, which emphasizes the fact that about as many non-Jewish as Jewish Poles were murdered during the war. This approach argues that Poles "did all they could (...) under the circumstances" to help Jews and tends to see Christian Poles as victims as much as Jews. Bergen observes that while this scholarship has produced valuable work regarding the suffering of non-Jewish Poles during the war, it sometimes achieves this by minimizing the suffering of Jews or even repeating some Antisemitic canards. The third interpretation is the "unequal victims" theory, which views both Polish gentiles and Jews as victims of Nazi Germany but to a different extent. It was believed for a time that roughly equal numbers of each group had been murdered in Poland by the Germans: about 3 million Polish Jews and, according to the higher estimate, 3 million non-Jewish Poles. Yet even accepting this estimate, the "unequal victims" theory highlights that number of non-Jewish Poles victims comprises 10% of the respective population, while for Polish Jews the 3 million murdered is close to 90% of the pre-war population. Bergen says that while this view has some validity, too often it ends up engaging in a "competition in suffering" and that such a "numbers game" does not make moral sense when talking about human agony. In response to these three approaches, Bergen cautions against broad generalizations, she emphasizes the range of experiences and notes that the fates of both groups were inexorably linked in complicated ways.

Antisemitism
Polish antisemitism had two formative motifs: claims of defilement of the Catholic faith; and Żydokomuna (Jew-communism). During the 1930s, Catholic journals in Poland paralleled western European social-Darwinist antisemitism and the Nazi press. However, church doctrine ruled out violence, which only became more common in the mid-1930s. Unlike German antisemitism, Polish political-ideological antisemites rejected the idea of genocide or pogroms of the Jews, advocating mass emigration instead.

Joseph Stalin's occupation of terror in eastern Poland in 1939 brought what Jan Gross calls "the institutionalization of resentment", whereby the Soviets used privileges and punishments to accommodate and encourage ethnic and religious differences between Jews and Poles. There was an upsurge in the anti-Semitic stereotype of Jews as Communist traitors; it erupted into mass murder when Nazi Germany invaded Soviet eastern Poland in the summer of 1941. A group of at least 40 Poles, with an unconfirmed level of German backing, murdered hundreds of Jews in the racially aggravated Jedwabne pogrom. There was a rash of other massacres of Jews across the same formerly Soviet-occupied region of Łomża and Białystok around the same time, with varying degrees of German death squad incitement or involvement: at Bielsk Podlaski (the village of Pilki), Choroszcz, Czyżew, Goniądz, Grajewo, Jasionówka, Kleszczele, Knyszyn, Kolno, Kuźnica, Narewka, Piątnica, Radziłów, Rajgród, Sokoły, Stawiski, Suchowola, Szczuczyn, Trzcianne, Tykocin, Wasilków, Wąsosz, and Wizna.

Rescue and aid

The vast majority of Polish Jews were a "visible minority" by modern standards, distinguishable by language, behavior, and appearance. In the 1931 Polish national census, only 12 percent of Jews declared Polish as their first language, while 79 percent listed Yiddish and the remaining 9 percent Hebrew as their mother tongue, although the census may have undercounted those whose primary language was Polish. Ability to speak Polish was a key factor in managing to survive, as were financial resources to pay helpers.

On 10 November 1941, capital punishment was extended by Hans Frank to Poles who helped Jews "in any way: by taking them in for a night, giving them a lift in a vehicle of any sort", or "feeding runaway Jews or selling them foodstuffs." The law was publicized with posters distributed in all major cities. Similar regulations were issued by the Germans in other territories they controlled on the Eastern Front. Over 700 Polish Righteous among the Nations received that recognition posthumously, having been murdered by the Germans for aiding or sheltering their Jewish neighbors. Toward the end of the ghetto-liquidation period, some Jews managed to escape to the "Aryan" side, and to survive with the aid of their Polish helpers. During the Nazi occupation, most ethnic Poles were themselves engaged in a desperate struggle to survive. Between 1939 and 1945, from 1.8 million to 2.8 million non-Jewish Poles were murdered by the Nazis, and 150,000 due to Soviet repressions. About a fifth of Poland's prewar population perished. Their deaths were the result of deliberate acts of war, mass murder, incarceration in concentration camps, forced labor, malnutrition, disease, kidnappings, and expulsions. At the same time, possibly a million gentile Poles aided their Jewish neighbors. Historian Richard C. Lukas gives an estimate as high as three million Polish helpers; an estimate similar to those cited by other authors.

Thousands of so-called Convent children hidden by the non-Jewish Poles and the Catholic Church remained in orphanages run by the Sisters of the Family of Mary in more than 20 locations, similar as in other Catholic convents. According to Gunnar S. Paulsson, "It was only those Jews who escaped whose fate was in the hands of the Polish population, and, as we have seen, the rate of survival among these Jews was relatively high, despite adverse conditions."

In September 1942, on the initiative of Zofia Kossak-Szczucka and with financial assistance from the Polish Underground State, a Provisional Committee to Aid Jews (Tymczasowy Komitet Pomocy Żydom) was founded for the purpose of rescuing Jews. It was superseded by the Council for Aid to Jews (Rada Pomocy Żydom), known by the code name Żegota and chaired by Julian Grobelny. It is not known how many Jews, overall, were helped by Żegota; at one point in 1943 it had 2,500 Jewish children under its care in Warsaw alone, under Irena Sendler. Żegota was granted nearly 29 million zloty (over $5 million) from 1942 on for relief payments to thousands of extended Jewish families in Poland. The Polish Government in Exile, headquartered in London, also provided special assistance – funds, arms, and other supplies – to Jewish resistance organizations such as the Jewish Combat Organization and the Jewish Military Union.

An estimated 30,000 to 60,000 Polish Jews survived in hiding. Some rescuers faced hostility or violence for their actions after the war.

The Polish Government in Exile was the first  to reveal the existence of German-run concentration camps and the systematic extermination of the Jews. The genocide was reported to the Allies by Lieutenant Jan Karski; and by Captain Witold Pilecki, who deliberately let himself be imprisoned at Auschwitz in order to gather intelligence, and subsequently wrote a report of over 100 pages for Poland's Home Army and the western Allies.

Collaboration and opportunism

The phenomenon of Polish collaboration was described by John Connelly and Leszek Gondek as marginal, when seen against the backdrop of European and world history. Estimates of the number of individual Polish collaborators vary from as few as 7,000 to as many as several hundred thousand. According to John Connelly "only a relatively small percentage of the Polish population engaged in activities that may be described as collaboration, when seen against the backdrop of European and world history." The same population, however, can be accused of indifference to the Jewish plight, a phenomenon which Connelly calls "structural collaboration". Szymon Datner claims that while fewer Poles murdered Jews from material greed or racial hatred than those who sheltered and aided them, the first group was more effective in doing so.

Some Polish peasants participated in German-organized Judenjagd ("Jew hunt") in the countryside, where according to Jan Grabowski, approximately 80% of the Jews who attempted to hide from the Germans ended up being murdered. Poles and Ukrainians also committed wartime pogroms, such as the 1941 Jedwabne pogrom and the Lviv pogrom. According to Grabowski, the number of "Judenjagd" victims could reach 200,000 in Poland alone; Szymon Datner gave a lower estimate - 100,000 Jews who "fell prey to the Germans and their local helpers, or were murdered in various unexplained circumstances."

Some locals benefited materially from persecuting the Jews. Several thousand Szmalcowniki - blackmailers - operated in Poland. 
The Polish Underground State strongly opposed this sort of collaboration, and threatened Szmalcowniki with death; sentences were usually given and carried out by the Underground courts. Jewish property, taken over by Poles, was a factor behind the beating and murdering of Jews by Poles between summer 1944 and 1946, including the Kielce pogrom.

In addition to peasantry and individual collaborators, the German authorities also mobilized the prewar Polish police as what became known as the "Blue Police". Among other duties, Polish policemen were tasked with patrolling for Jewish ghetto escapees, and in support of military operations against the Polish resistance. At its peak in May 1944, the Blue Police numbered some 17,000 men. The Germans also formed the Baudienst ("construction service") in several districts of the General Government. Baudienst servicemen were sometimes deployed in support of aktions (roundup of Jews for deportation or extermination), for example to blockade Jewish quarters or to search Jewish homes for hideaways and valuables. By 1944, Baudienst strength had grown to some 45,000 servicemen.

The Polish right-wing National Armed Forces (Narodowe Siły Zbrojne, or NSZ) – a nationalist, anti-communist organization, widely perceived as anti-Semitic – also collaborated with the Germans on several occasions, killing or giving away Jewish partisans to the German authorities, and murdering Jewish refugees.

National minorities' role in the Holocaust

The Republic of Poland was a multicultural country before the Second World War broke out, with almost a third of its population originating from the minority groups: 13.9 percent Ukrainians; 10 percent Jews; 3.1 percent Belorussians; 2.3 percent Germans and 3.4 percent Czechs, Lithuanians and Russians. Soon after the 1918 reconstitution of an independent Polish state, about 500,000 refugees from the Soviet republics came to Poland in the first spontaneous flight from persecution especially in Ukraine (see, Pale of Settlement) where up to 2,000 pogroms took place during the Civil War. In the second wave of immigration, between November 1919 and June 1924 some 1,200,000 people left the territory of the USSR for new Poland. It is estimated that some 460,000 refugees spoke Polish as the first language. Between 1933 and 1938, around 25,000 German Jews fled Nazi Germany to sanctuary in Poland.

Some one million Polish citizens were members of the country's German minority. Following the 1939 invasion, an additional 1,180,000 German-speakers came to occupied Poland, from the Reich (Reichsdeutsche) or (Volksdeutsche going "Heim ins Reich") from the east. Many hundreds of ethnically German men in Poland joined the Nazi Volksdeutscher Selbstschutz as well as Sonderdienst formations launched in May 1940 by Gauleiter Hans Frank stationed in occupied Kraków. Likewise, among some 30,000 Ukrainian nationalists who fled to polnischen Gebiete, thousands joined the pokhidny hrupy (pl) as saboteurs, interpreters, and civilian militiamen, trained at the German bases across Distrikt Krakau.

The existence of Sonderdienst formations was a grave danger to Catholic Poles who attempted to help ghettoized Jews in cities with sizable German and pro-German minorities, as in the case of the Izbica,  and Mińsk Mazowiecki Ghettos, among many others. Anti-Semitic attitudes were particularly visible in the eastern provinces which had been occupied by the Soviets following the Soviet invasion of the Kresy. Local people had witnessed the repressions against their own compatriots, and mass deportations to Siberia, conducted by the Soviet NKVD, with some local Jews forming militias, taking over key administrative posts, and collaborating with the NKVD. Other locals assumed that, driven by vengeance, Jewish communists had been prominent in betraying the ethnically Polish and other non-Jewish victims.

Pogroms and massacres

Many German-inspired massacres were carried out across occupied eastern Poland with the active participation of indigenous people. The guidelines for such massacres were formulated by Reinhard Heydrich, who ordered his officers to induce anti-Jewish pogroms on territories newly occupied by the German forces. In the lead-up to the establishment of the Wilno Ghetto in the fifth largest city of prewar Poland and a provincial capital Wilno (now Vilnius, Lithuania), German commandos and the Lithuanian Auxiliary Police Battalions killed more than 21,000 Jews during the Ponary massacre in late 1941. At that time, Wilno had only a small Lithuanian-speaking minority of about 6 percent of the city's population. In the series of Lviv pogroms committed by the Ukrainian militants in the eastern city of Lwów (now Lviv, Ukraine), some 6,000 Polish Jews were murdered in the streets between June 30 and July 29, 1941, on top of 3,000 arrests and mass shootings by Einsatzgruppe C. The Ukrainian militias formed by OUN with the blessings of the SS spread terror across dozens of locations throughout south-eastern Poland.

Long before the Tarnopol Ghetto was set up, and only two days after the arrival of the Wehrmacht, up to 2,000 Jews were killed in the provincial capital of Tarnopol (now Ternopil, Ukraine), one-third of them by the Ukrainian militias. Some of the victims were decapitated. The SS shot the remaining two-thirds, in the same week. In Stanisławów – another provincial capital in the Kresy macroregion (now Ivano-Frankivsk, Ukraine) – the single largest massacre of Polish Jews prior to Aktion Reinhardt was perpetrated on October 12, 1941, hand in glove by Orpo, SiPo and the Ukrainian Auxiliary Police (brought in from Lwów); tables with sandwiches and bottles of vodka had been set up about the cemetery for shooters who needed to rest from the deafening noise of gunfire; 12,000 Jews were murdered before nightfall.

A total of 31 deadly pogroms were carried out throughout the region in conjunction with the Belarusian, Lithuanian and Ukrainian Schuma. The genocidal techniques learned from the Germans, such as the advanced planning of the pacification actions, site selection, and sudden encirclement, became the hallmark of the OUN-UPA massacres of Poles and Jews in Volhynia and Eastern Galicia beginning in March 1943, parallel with the liquidation of the ghettos in Reichskommissariat Ostland ordered by Himmler. Thousands of Jews who escaped deportations and hid in the forests were murdered by the Banderites.

Survivors 
The exact number of Holocaust survivors is unknown. Up to 300,000 Jewish Poles were among the 1.5 million Polish citizens deported from eastern Poland by the Soviets after the Nazi-Soviet invasion of Poland of 1939, putting Jews deep in the USSR and thereby out of the range of the Nazi invasion of eastern Poland in 1941. Many deportees died in the Gulags, but thousands of Jews joined the Polish Anders Army on its journey from Soviet camps to the British Empire and thereby made Aliyah; thousands more joined the Polish Berling Army which fought its way back to Poland and on to the Battle of Berlin. Possibly as many as 300,000 Polish Jews escaped from German-occupied Poland to the Soviet-occupied zone soon after the war started. Some estimates are significantly larger. A very high percentage of the Jews fleeing east were men and women without families. Thousands in this group perished at the hands of OUN-UPA, TDA and Ypatingasis būrys during Massacres of Poles in Volhynia, the Holocaust in Lithuania (see Ponary massacre), and in Belarus.

The question regarding the Jews' real chances of survival once the Holocaust began is a subject of study among historians. The majority of Polish Jews in the Generalgouvernement stayed put. Prior to the mass deportations, there was no proven necessity to leave familiar places. When the ghettos were closed from the outside, smuggling of food kept most of the inhabitants alive. Escape into clandestine existence on the "Aryan" side was attempted by some 100,000 Jews, and, contrary to popular misconceptions, the risk of them being turned in by the Poles was very small. The Germans made it extremely difficult to escape the ghettos just before deportations to death camps deceptively disguised as "resettlement in the East". All passes were cancelled, walls rebuilt containing fewer gates, with policemen replaced by SS-men. Some victims already deported to Treblinka were forced to write form letters back home, stating that they were safe. Around 3,000 others fell into the German Hotel Polski trap. Many ghettoized Jews did not believe what was going on until the very end, because the actual outcome seemed unthinkable at the time. David J. Landau suggested also that the weak Jewish leadership might have played a role. Likewise, Israel Gutman proposed that the Polish Underground might have attacked the camps and blown up the railway tracks leading to them, but as noted by Paulsson, such ideas are a product of hindsight.

It is estimated that about 350,000 Polish Jews survived the Holocaust. Some 230,000 of them survived in the USSR and the Soviet-controlled territories of Poland, including men and women who escaped from areas occupied by Germany. After World War II, over 150,000 Polish Jews (Berendt) or 180,000 (Engel) were repatriated or expelled back to new Poland along with the younger men conscripted to the Red Army from the Kresy in 1940–1941. Their families were murdered in the Holocaust. Gunnar S. Paulsson estimated that 30,000 Polish Jews survived in the labor camps; but according to Engel as many as 70,000–80,000 of them were liberated from camps in Germany and Austria alone, except that declaring their own nationality was of no use to those who did not intend to return. Madajczyk estimated that as many as 110,000 Polish Jews were in the Displaced Person camps. According to Longerich, up to 50,000 Jews survived in the forests (not counting Galicia) and also among the soldiers who reentered Poland with the pro-Soviet Polish "Berling army" formed by Stalin. The number of Jews who successfully hid on the "Aryan" side of the ghettos could be as high as 100,000, according to Peter Longerich, although many were murdered by the German Jagdkommandos. Dariusz Stola found that the most plausible estimates were between 30,000 and 60,000.

Not all survivors registered with CKŻP (Central Committee of Polish Jews) after the war ended.

Border changes and repatriations

The German surrender in May 1945 was followed by a massive change in the political geography of Europe. Poland's borders were redrawn by the Allies according to the demands made by Joseph Stalin during the Tehran Conference, confirmed as not negotiable at the Yalta Conference of 1945. The Polish government-in-exile was excluded from the negotiations. The territory of Poland was reduced by approximately 20 percent. Before the end of 1946 some 1.8 million Polish citizens were expelled and forcibly resettled within the new borders. For the first time in its history Poland became a homogeneous one nation-state by force, with the national wealth reduced by 38 percent. Poland's financial system had been destroyed. Intelligentsia was largely obliterated along with the Jews, and the population reduced by about 33 percent.

Due to the territorial shift imposed from the outside, the number of Holocaust survivors from Poland remains the subject of deliberation. According to official statistics, the number of Jews in the country changed dramatically in a very short time. In January 1946, the Central Committee of Polish Jews (CKŻP) registered the first wave of some 86,000 survivors from the vicinity. By the end of that summer, the number had risen to about 205,000–210,000 (with 240,000 registrations and over 30,000 duplicates). The survivors included 180,000 Jews who arrived from the Soviet-controlled territories as a result repatriation agreements. Another 30,000 Jews returned to Poland from the USSR after the Stalinist repressions ended a decade later.

Aliyah Bet from Europe
In July 1946 forty-two Jews and two ethnic Poles were murdered in the Kielce pogrom. Eleven of the victims died from bayonet wounds and eleven more were fatally shot with military assault rifles, indicating direct involvement of the regular troops. The pogrom prompted General Spychalski of PWP from wartime Warsaw, to sign a legislative decree allowing the remaining survivors to leave Poland without Western visas or Polish exit permits. This also served to strengthen the government's acceptance among the anti-Communist right, as well as weaken the British hold in the Middle East. Most refugees crossing the new borders left Poland without a valid passport. By contrast, the Soviet Union brought Soviet Jews from DP camps back to USSR by force, along with all other Soviet citizens irrespective of their wishes, as agreed to by the Yalta Conference.

Uninterrupted traffic across the Polish borders increased dramatically. By the spring of 1947 only 90,000 Jews remained in Poland. Britain demanded that Poland (among others) halt the Jewish exodus, but their pressure was largely unsuccessful. The massacre in Kielce was condemned by a public announcement sent by the diocese in Kielce to all churches. The letter denounced the pogrom and "stressed – wrote Natalia Aleksiun – that the most important Catholic values were the love of fellow human beings and respect for human life. It also alluded to the demoralizing effect of anti-Jewish violence, since the crime was committed in the presence of youth and children." Priests read it without comments during Mass, hinting that "the pogrom might have in fact been a political provocation."

Approximately 7,000 Jewish men and women of military age left Poland for Mandatory Palestine between 1947 and 1948 as members of Haganah organization, trained in Poland. The boot camp was set up in Bolków, Lower Silesia, with Polish-Jewish instructors. It was financed by JDC in agreement with the Polish administration. The program which trained mostly men 22–25 years of age for service in the Israel Defense Forces lasted until early 1949. Joining the training was a convenient way to leave the country, since the course graduates were not controlled at the border, and could carry undeclared valuables and even restricted firearms.

Postwar trials
After the war, the International Military Tribunal at the Nuremberg Trials and Poland's Supreme National Tribunal concluded that the aim of German policies in Poland – the extermination of Jews, Poles, Roma, and others – had "all the characteristics of genocide in the biological meaning of this term."

Holocaust memorials and commemoration 

There are many memorials in Poland dedicated to Holocaust remembrance. The  Monument to the Ghetto Heroes in Warsaw was unveiled in April 1948. Major museums include the Auschwitz-Birkenau State Museum on the outskirts of Oświęcim with 1.4 million visitors per year, and the POLIN Museum of the History of Polish Jews in Warsaw on the site of the former Ghetto, presenting the thousand-year history of the Jews in Poland. Since 1988, an annual international event called March of the Living takes place in April at the former Auschwitz-Birkenau camp complex on Holocaust Remembrance Day, with total attendance exceeding 150,000 young people from all over the world.

There are State museums on the grounds of each of the Operation Reinhard death camps, including the Majdanek State Museum in Lublin, declared a national monument as early as 1946, with intact gas chambers and crematoria from World War II. Branches of the Majdanek Museum include the Bełżec, and the Sobibór Museums where advanced geophysical studies are being conducted by Israeli and Polish archaeologists. The new Treblinka Museum opened in 2006. It was later expanded and made into a branch of the Siedlce Regional Museum located in a historic Ratusz (see also the Siedlce Ghetto). There is also a small museum in Chełmno nad Nerem.

The Radegast train station is a Holocaust memorial in Łódź.
The Oskar Schindler's Enamel Factory covers the Holocaust in Kraków.

There is a Holocaust memorial at the former Umschlagplatz in Warsaw.

According to a 2020 survey by researchers at the Jagiellonian University, only 10% of respondents were able to give the correct figure of the number of Jews killed during the Holocaust in Poland. Half believed that non-Jewish Poles suffered equally during the war, and 20% thought that non-Jewish Poles suffered the most.

Notes

References

Works cited 
 
  
 
  
 
 
 
 
 
 
 
 Musiał, Bogdan (ed.), "Treblinka — ein Todeslager der Aktion Reinhard", in: Aktion Reinhard — Die Vernichtung der Juden im Generalgouvernement, Osnabrück 2004, pp. 257–281.
 
 
 Paulsson, Gunnar S. Secret City: The Hidden Jews of Warsaw, 1940–1945. New Haven: Yale University Press, 2002, 
 Sterling, Eric; Roth, John K. (2005), Life in the Ghettos During the Holocaust. Syracuse University Press, 356 pages.

Further reading

External links 

 Center for Research on the Holocaust in Poland

 
Webarchive template wayback links
Poland